Namasthe Telangana Indian Telugu-language daily newspaper published from Hyderabad, Telangana. It was launched on 6 June 2011. The paper aims to mainly focus on politics and developments of Telangana State. The newspaper is published by Telangana Publications Pvt. Limited, owned by K. Chandrashekar Rao, the current chief minister of Telangana.

With more than 3,00,000 copies sold per day, it is the third-largest newspaper In Telangana after Eenadu and Sakshi.

History
The newspaper started in June 2011 with Allam Narayana as Editor in Chief, at Telangana Bhavan, TRS party headquarters. Now Thigulla Krishna Murthy took over as the editor of the paper. Chairman and managing director C. L. Rajam, who managed the paper from October 2011 to 1 July 2014, handed over the reins again to Divakonda Damodar Rao, the founder and managing director of the paper. The columnists include; Editorial by Katta Shekhar, R. Vidyasagar Rao.

Publishing
It is published from Nizamabad, Karimnagar, Warangal, Khammam, Nalgonda, Hyderabad, and Mahbubnagar.

The newspaper is also available in ePaper format.

Readership and revenue
According to India Today survey 2017, Namasthe Telangana stood as the third most read newspaper in Telangana, with 31.49 lac circulation, behind Eenadu and Sakshi. Since 2014, It grew by 88% in three years since.

Based on the data obtained from Right to Information, Expenditure of the Government of Telangana on Namasthe Telangana has seen an increase of 387.4%, from 2.6 crore to 12.8 crore between 2016 and 2018.

See also
 List of newspapers in India
 List of newspapers in India by circulation
 List of newspapers in the world by circulation

References

External links
 Namaste Telangana website
 Namaste Telangana ePaper
 Telugu News

Daily newspapers published in India
Telugu-language newspapers
Newspapers published in Hyderabad
2011 establishments in Andhra Pradesh
Publications established in 2011